The Girl of the Golden West (German:Das Mädchen aus dem goldenen Westen) is a 1922 German silent film directed by Hans Werckmeister.

Plot summary

Cast
 Georg Alexander as Adliger Tunichtgut  
 Franz Biehler 
 Karen Brand 
  as Notar  
 Renée Pelar 
 Heinrich Römer 
 C.W. Tetting
 Maria Zelenka

References

Bibliography
 Dietrich Scheunemann. Expressionist Film: New Perspectives. Camden House, 2006.

External links
 

1922 films
Films of the Weimar Republic
German silent feature films
German black-and-white films